Endapalli is a village in West Godavari district of the Indian state of Andhra Pradesh. It is located in Chintalapudi mandal.

References

Villages in West Godavari district